John M. (Sean) Cadogan is  Professor of Physics at the University of New South Wales and a former Canada Research Chair in Advanced Materials.
 
Using advanced nuclear techniques, he studies the magnetic compounds formed between rare earth elements and transition elements. Materials with magnetic properties have played a central role in the development of modern technology, and are used in many every-day devices. Rare-earth materials promise magnetic properties beyond the capabilities of those used in the past and so are essential to the continued evolution and development of new technologies. They also have the potential to improve energy efficiency in applications ranging from advanced motors to new refrigeration technologies, and to reduce the environmental side effects of current technology.

Cadogan also uses nuclear techniques to explore "soft-magnetic" materials based on iron and other elements, which are found in such applications as the transformer cores used by the electrical power industry

Personal  

Cadogan became a Tier 1 Canada Research Chair at the University of Manitoba in July, 2007. He began his formal training in his homeland of Australia, earning his PhD in 1983 from the University of New South Wales. In 1984 he left for Dublin, Ireland, where he was a Postdoctoral Research Fellow in the Department of Pure and Applied Physics at Trinity College, Dublin. He then returned to Australia in 1987 and began his teaching and research career in earnest.

Cadogan has authored over 200 peer-reviewed journal articles, has been awarded peer-reviewed research funding of over $5 million, and was elected to Fellowship of the Australian Institute of Physics in 2001. He is a regular referee of research papers submitted for publication to ten international scientific journals and he has served as an Associate Editor for a special 2-volume edition of the Journal of Magnetism and Magnetic Materials.

References

Year of birth missing (living people)
Living people
Academic staff of the University of New South Wales
Academic staff of the University of Manitoba
Australian physicists
Canada Research Chairs
Fellows of the Australian Institute of Physics